The Ambrosian Singers are an English choral group based in London.

History

They were founded after World War II in England. One of their co-founders was Denis Stevens (1922–2004), a British musicologist and viola player who joined the BBC Music Department in 1949 and developed programs of Renaissance and early Baroque music. Stevens conducted them from 1956 to 1960. The other was John McCarthy (1919–2009), a professional tenor soloist. McCarthy continued to conduct them until the late 1980s. During the 1960s the choir called on the services of between 600 and 700 singers.

They organised and created the Ambrosian Singers as a small professional chorus in 1951, initially to sing polyphonic choruses for renaissance and medieval pieces for The History of Music series. However, their repertoire greatly expanded afterwards. Depending on the style to be sung and on the occasion, they may go by the names "the Ambrosian Light Opera Chorus", "the Ambrossian Chorus", the "Ambrosian Choir" or "London Symphony Orchestra Chorus". In 1956 a six-singer group was founded within the Ambrosian Singers called "the Ambrosian Consort", specialising in the singing of Renaissance music in period languages.

The Ambrosian singers have been the training ground for a large number of professional artists.  Famous members have included Heather Harper, Dorothy Dorow, Janet Baker, Sarah Walker, Margaret Price, Robert Tear, Ian Partridge and John Shirley-Quirk.

Ambrosian Singers have participated in numerous Christmas albums, appeared in albums with such pop and rock artists as Neil Diamond, Grace Jones, Talk Talk, Julie Andrews, etc., and sung in several studio cast albums of Broadway musicals. They have participated in various film soundtrack scores such as Brainstorm, Empire of the Sun, Krull, Chariots of Fire, Children of the Stones and The Secret of NIMH, and in some albums of Italian films: Film Scores of Ennio Morricone and Nino Rota (conducted by Henry Mancini, collections of Miklos Rozsa scores, and original scores from MGM classic musicals. They did the introduction vocals for the song "Inside" by Stiltskin in 1994.  They also were the chorus that sang Mozart's Requiem in the film Amadeus. In 1962, the Ambrosian Singers also recorded as the Norman Luboff Choir for the RCA Victor album "Inspiration" with the New Symphony Orchestra of London conducted by Leopold Stokowski.

Show Boat controversy

In 1987, the Ambrosian Singers took part in John McGlinn's recording of Show Boat, an album performed by singers drawn from the worlds of both opera and popular music. The recording invited controversy, as the lyrics of the original 1927 score used by McGlinn included the racially offensive word "nigger". Originally an all-black British choir had been intended to sing the "black" roles in the musical, but they had walked out after discovering the content of the lyrics that they were going to be required to sing. As a consequence, the Ambrosian Singers sang both the "white" and the "black" parts of the musical. The recording was arranged by EMI who "didn't care they were white". The recording went on to be a critical and commercial success, leading to other opera singers' being invited to perform pieces from Broadway musicals.

Involvement in opera
The Ambrosian Singers are also called the Ambrosian Opera Chorus. or the Ambrosian Chorus. or the Ambrosian Choir.  The ensemble has made numerous recordings of complete operas under various noted conductors including Zubin Mehta, Carlo Maria Giulini, Claudio Abbado, Lamberto Gardelli, Nello Santi, Julius Rudel, Georges Prêtre and many more. From 1961 to 1966, when McCarthy was a choral director of the London Symphony Orchestra, the Ambrosian Singers were known as the London Symphony Orchestra Chorus.

Under various names (Ambrosian Singers, Ambrosian Opera Chorus, Ambrosian Chorus, Ambrosian Choir, London Symphony Orchestra Chorus or The John McCarthy Singers), the ensemble has appeared in various type of recording albums with many renowned operatic singers, recording recitals, sacred music, selected arias and complete operas with Montserrat Caballé, Joan Sutherland, Kiri Te Kanawa, Luciano Pavarotti, Plácido Domingo, José Carreras and many more.

Their singing style has been described variously as "stylish", nimble, and "like an obedient battalion".

Selected operatic discography

Note: "Cat:" is short for catalogue number by the label company.

Musical theatre discography
 Jerome Kern: Show Boat, conducted by John McGlinn; EMI Records, 1988
 Cole Porter: Anything Goes, conducted by John McGlinn; EMI Records, 1989
 Richard Rodgers: My Funny Valentine: Frederica von Stade sings Rodgers and Hart, conducted by John McGlinn; EMI Records, 1990

References

External links
Bach-Cantatas.com page on the Ambrosian Singers
Joseph Stevenson, "Ambrosian Singers". Classical Artist Biographies. All Media Guide, 2008.

British vocal groups
London choirs
English classical music groups
Musical groups established in 1951
1951 establishments in England